Robert Vanderstockt (11 May 1924 – 27 December 1994) was a Belgian racing cyclist. He rode in the 1952 Tour de France.

References

1924 births
1994 deaths
Belgian male cyclists
Place of birth missing